Shrirampur Assembly constituency is one of the 288 Vidhan Sabha (legislative assembly) constituencies of Maharashtra state, western India. This constituency is located in Ahmednagar district.

Geographical scope
The constituency comprises Shrirampur taluka and Deolali revenue circle and Deolali Pravara Municipal Council belonging to Rahuri taluka.

Representatives
 1980: Bhanudas Kashinath Murkute of the Indian National Congress (Indira).
 1985: Daulatrao Malhari Pawar of the Indian National Congress (Socialist).
 1990: Bhanudas Kashinath Murkute of the Janata Dal.
 1995: Bhanudas Kashinath Murkute of the Indian National Congress.(INC)
 1999: Jayant Murlidhar Sasane of the Indian National Congress.(INC).
2004: Jayant Murlidhar Sasane of the Indian National Congress.(INC).
Seat reserved for Schedule Caste 2009 onwards.
2009: Bhausaheb Malhari Kamble, of the Indian National Congress. (INC).
2014: Bhausaheb Malhari Kamble, of the Indian National Congress. (INC).
 2019: Lahu Kanade (INC)

References

Assembly constituencies of Maharashtra
Shrirampur